The A. A. Payne–John Christo Sr. House is a historic house at 940 West Beach Drive in Panama City, Florida.

Description and history 
On July 16, 2008, it was added to the U.S. National Register of Historic Places.

It is also known as FMSF#BY451.

References

Houses on the National Register of Historic Places in Florida
Buildings and structures in Panama City, Florida
Colonial Revival architecture in Florida
Houses completed in 1927
Houses in Bay County, Florida
National Register of Historic Places in Bay County, Florida